Mariano di Jacopo (1382 – c. 1453), called Taccola ("the jackdaw"), was an Italian polymath, administrator, artist and engineer of the early Renaissance. Taccola is known for his technological treatises De ingeneis and De machinis, which feature annotated drawings of a wide array of innovative machines and devices. Taccola's work was widely studied and copied by later Renaissance engineers and artists, among them Francesco di Giorgio, and Leonardo da Vinci.

Life and career 
Mariano Taccola was born in Siena in 1382. Practically nothing is known of his early years of training or apprenticeship. As an adult, he pursued a varied career in Siena, working in such diverse jobs as notary, university secretary, sculptor, superintendent of roads and hydraulic engineer. In the 1440s, Taccola retired from his official positions, receiving a pension from the state. He is known to have joined the fraternal order of San Jacomo by 1453 and presumably died around that date.

Work and style 
Taccola left behind two treatises, the first being De ingeneis (Concerning engines), work on its four books starting as early as 1419.  Having been completed in 1433, Taccola continued to amend drawings and annotations to De ingeneis until about 1449. In the same year, Taccola published his second manuscript, De machinis (Concerning machines), in which he restated many of the devices from the long development process of his first treatise.

Drawn with black ink on paper and accompanied by hand-written annotations, Taccola depicts in his work a multitude of 'ingenious devices' in hydraulic engineering, milling, construction and war machinery. Taccola's drawings show him to be a man of transition: While his subject matter is already that of later Renaissance artist-engineers, his method of representation still owes much to medieval manuscript illustration. Notably, with perspective coming and going in his drawings, Taccola seemed to remain largely unaware of the ongoing revolution in perspective painting. This is the more curious, since he is the only man known to have interviewed the 'father of linear perspectivity' himself, Filippo Brunelleschi. Despite these graphic inconsistencies, Taccola's style has been described as being forceful, authentic and usually to be relied upon to capture the essential.

Influence and rediscovery 
The work of Taccola, named the 'Sienese Archimedes', stands at the beginning of the tradition of Italian Renaissance artist-engineers, with a growing interest in technological matters of all kinds. Taccola's drawings were copied and served as a source of inspiration by such as Buonacorso Ghiberti, Francesco di Giorgio, and perhaps even Leonardo da Vinci. Of special historical importance are his drawings of the ingenious lifting devices and reversible-gear systems which Brunelleschi devised for the construction of the dome of the Florence cathedral, at the time the second widest in the world.

Interest in Taccola's work, however, practically ceased some time after his death until the late 20th century, one reason perhaps being that his treatises circulated only as hand-copied books, with at least three of them remaining extant today.

Gallery

References

Sources 
  (This edition reproduces Books III and IV of de Ingeneis)
  (This edition also reproduces Books III and IV of de Ingeneis)

External links 
 
 Institute and Museum of the History of Science – Online-Exposition about Taccola's drawings

1382 births
1453 deaths
Italian artists
Italian civil engineers
Italian military engineers
People from Siena
Renaissance artists
15th-century Italian engineers
Medieval military writers
15th-century Italian writers